Seaforth is a community of the Halifax Regional Municipality in the Canadian province of Nova Scotia. Seaforth is home to the Hope For Wildlife Society, an organisation dedicated to helping injured wild animals. The community was named for Seaforth, Merseyside, in England.

References

External links
 Explore HRM
 Hope For Wildlife

Communities in Halifax, Nova Scotia
General Service Areas in Nova Scotia